Alvin Eugene Snow Jr. (born October 30, 1981) is an American former professional basketball player. Snow is also a 2 time Hall of Fame inductee (Franklin High School and Eastern Washington University).

Professional career
Snow signed with Úrvalsdeild karla club Njarðvík in March 2005, along with Doug Wrenn, replacing Americans Anthony Lackey and Matt Sayman. He appeared in two playoff games for Njarðvík against ÍR, averaging 20.5 points, 6.5 rebounds and 10.0 assists in the 0-2 series loss.

References

1981 births
Living people
American expatriate basketball people in Cyprus
American expatriate basketball people in Germany
American expatriate basketball people in Iceland
American expatriate basketball people in Israel
American expatriate basketball people in Kosovo
American expatriate basketball people in Poland
American expatriate basketball people in Slovenia
American expatriate basketball people in Turkey
American men's basketball players
APOEL B.C. players
Basketball players from Washington (state)
Eastern Washington Eagles men's basketball players
Gaziantep Basketbol players
Guards (basketball)
Ironi Ashkelon players
Karşıyaka basketball players
KB Prishtina players
Njarðvík men's basketball players
SKK Kotwica Kołobrzeg players
Sportspeople from Renton, Washington
Trabzonspor B.K. players
Úrvalsdeild karla (basketball) players
Franklin High School (Seattle) alumni